Nice Hockey Côte d'Azur is a French ice hockey team based in Nice also known as "Les Aigles de Nice". The Eagles are members of the Ligue Magnus and play their home games at Palais des sports Jean-Bouin.

History

Nice Hockey Club
Nice Hockey Club was founded in 1969, and initially played in Division 2, at the time the lowest tier of Ice Hockey in France. Following the culmination of the 1979 season, Nice were promoted to Division 1, the 2nd tier. After spending four seasons in Division 1, a fire destroyed Nice's rink, and thus they were relegated back to Division 2. After finding a new rink at the Palais des Sports Jean-Bouin, Nice were promoted back to Division 1 at the end of the 1984 season having won Division 2.

After spending four seasons in Division 1, Nice were once again demoted to the third tier of French hockey, however, following a spate of liquidations, the FFHG were forced to merge the top two divisions, and as such Nice found themselves back in Division 1. The Les Aigles (the Eagles) moniker was adopted by the club in 1994. The Eagles remained in Division 1 until the 1998-99 season, wherein they forfeited the season and were relegated to Division 3. Following a league wide reshuffle, the team was again promoted to Division 2 after the 2000-01 season. 
Nice would continue to play in Division 2 for two more seasons, before folding due to financial difficulties in 2003.

Nice hockey Côte d'Azur
The team would return the following season with a new name, Nice hockey Côte d'Azur. In their first season back in Division 3, NCHA finished as champions and promotion to Division 2. The Eagles gained promotion from Division 2 four years later following the culmination of the 2007-08 season. Nice would go on to win the 2015-16 Division 2, and following a play-off final victory against Anglet, they would be promoted to the Ligue Magnus for the first time in the club's history. As of the 2014-15 the Eagles also have a feeder team playing in Division 3.

Roster 
Updated February 12, 2019.

|}

Championships
 Champion Division 1 - 2016
 Champion Division 2 - 1984 & 2008
 Champion Division 3 - 2004
 Winner Coupe de France Nationale C - 1979

References

External links
 Les Aigles de Nice Website

Ice hockey teams in France
Sport in Nice